RA (stylized as R∆) is the second studio album by American singer-songwriter and record producer Simon Curtis. It was released independently on June 7, 2011. The album peaked at number 20 on the Billboard Dance/Electronic Albums chart.

Background and composition 
Curtis described RA as a "diary of where my mind has been during the past year of my life, dealing with deep betrayal, heartache, sex and the exploration of what lengths someone will go to to achieve his destiny" and said 8-Bit Heart was "a plea for love" and that RA "doesn't want anything to do with it."

Critical reception 
Sam Lansky of MuuMuse noted the influence of Britney Spears as well as Darren Hayes on the album and said that while Curtis "knows that creating music that makes us want to dance is imperative" he, "like Darren, ... writes out of some very private vulnerability, documenting the darkest pieces of himself – the rage and the resentment, the envy and the cynicism – in a way that makes the music so much more compelling than it would be if he’d kept it all neatly compartmentalized."

Track listing

Charts

References

External links
Official website

2011 albums
Self-released albums